Ronnbergia wuelfinghoffii is a species of flowering plant in the family Bromeliaceae, native to western Colombia and Ecuador. It was first described in 1998 as Aechmea wuelfinghoffii. Its natural habitat is subtropical or tropical moist lowland forests. It is threatened by habitat loss.

References

Bromelioideae
Flora of Colombia
Flora of Ecuador
Vulnerable plants
Plants described in 1998
Taxonomy articles created by Polbot